The Headland of Point Riche is located near the community of Port au Choix on the Great Northern Peninsula of the island of Newfoundland in the Canadian province of Newfoundland and Labrador. Point Riche to Cape Bonavista was the defining points of coastline where the French could fish around the coast of Newfoundland which is called the French Shore. The point is marked by the Point Riche Lighthouse.

Notes

External links
Point Riche Lighthouse - Lighthouse Friends

Headlands of Newfoundland and Labrador